"A Bad Goodbye" is a song written by American country music artist Clint Black, and recorded by him as a duet with fellow country music artist Wynonna.  The song was recorded after the two toured together during their "Black and Wy" tour in 1993.  It was released in May 1993 as the first single from Black's album No Time to Kill.  It peaked at number 2 on the Billboard Hot Country Singles & Tracks (now Hot Country Songs) chart, behind "Chattahoochee" by Alan Jackson. In addition, it was Black's first appearance on the Billboard Hot 100, peaking at number 43 there.

The song was also nominated for Vocal Event of the Year at the 1993 Academy of Country Music awards.

Critical reception
In his review of Black's album, Time magazine reviewer Christopher John Farley noted that Judd's voice "draws out an emotional edge" in Black's voice. Overall, he thought that the collaboration added an edge to No Time to Kill that Black's first three albums lacked. Deborah Evans Price, of Billboard magazine reviewed the song favorably, calling the lyrics "direct, moving and majestic." She goes on to say that the song has "'single of the year' written all over it."

The song followed a "Black & Wy" tour, which featured Black and Judd touring together.

Music video
The music video was directed by Peter Nydrle and produced by Paul Flattery. It was shot in Arizona during their "Black & Wy" tour and premiered in May 1993.

Chart positions
"A Bad Goodbye" debuted at number 55 on the U.S. Billboard Hot Country Singles & Tracks for the week of May 15, 1993.

Year-end charts

References

1993 singles
Clint Black songs
Wynonna Judd songs
Male–female vocal duets
Songs written by Clint Black
Song recordings produced by Clint Black
Song recordings produced by James Stroud
RCA Records Nashville singles
1993 songs